Mario Löprich, better known by his stage name Martin Mann (born Vienna, 10 March 1944) is a German Schlager singer and songwriter. Mann had big success with the song "Meilenweit" ("Miles for miles") in 1971.

Discography
Albums
Live Im Studio (1971)
Das Leben ist schön (1973)
... auf neuen Wegen (1977)
Mann – er kommt! (1999)
Meilenweit (compilation, 2002)

Singles
Cecilia / Das ist die Ruhe vor dem Sturm (1970)
Meilenweit / Das gewisse Etwas (1971)
Die Brücke von San Francisco / Junge Liebe (1972)
Heut' woll'n wir leben / Das Leben ist schön (1972)
Bind ein blaues Band um unsern Birkenbaum / Reich mir die Hand (1973) ´
Rab-Da-Da-Dab / Goodbye Marie (1973) 
Strohblumen (Sunflower) / Ich glaube dir (1977)
Die Welt / Gegen das Gesetz (1979)
Lass doch mal den Charly ran / Ein heisses Eisen (1980)
Weil ich dich nicht liebe / Mach dir keine Sorgen (1991)
Heut' woll'n wir leben / Das Leben ist schön
Mädchen komm ganz nah an meine grüne Seite / Barbara
Boogie Woogie / Wiederseh'n, Adios, Bye Bye (1981)
Weil sie noch nicht mal 16 war / Des Rockers Leid (1977)
Mädchen zieh deine Schuhe aus / Du kannst bei mir wohnen
Küssen am hellichten Tag / Komm in die Stadt
Ich will keine Braut, die mir meine Freiheit klaut / Zwischen 2 Feuern
1-1-8 / Die Stadt im Regen
Mein Brief an Julie (Julie do you love me) / Mehr und mehr
Ich bin bereit

References

1944 births
Living people